Pushpavathy P R, also known as Pushpavathy Poypadathu is an Indian singer, composer and lyricist. Trained in Carnatic Vocal, Pushpavathy holds a Post Graduate Diploma (Ganapraveena) from Chembai Memorial Government Music College, Palakkad and received her advanced training under Guru Mangad Natesan (1994-2005). Pushpa's first directorial venture was a music album based on the Poems of Kabir (Kabir Music of Harmony 2005) which has won critical acclaim in many platforms and was a best seller too. Pushpavathy was a B grade artist with AIR (All India Radio) from 1999 to 2004.

Awards
 2001 Kerala Sangeetha Nataka Academy Puthukkode Krishnamoorthy Endowment Award 
 2012 Santhosham South Indian Film Awards for the Female Singer, Malayalam Song Champavu
 2011 Vayalar Rama Varma Chalachitra TV Puraskarm, Best Female Singer
 2014 Njaralathu Rama Poduval Purskaram 
 2016 Advocate R. Shiva Prasad Smaraka Award
 Scholarship from Dept. of Culture- Govt. India (2001-2003).

As playback singer

Albums

External links
മലയാളം ക്ലബ്ഹൗസ് ചര്‍ച്ചകള്‍ കേട്ടപ്പോള്‍ ജീനിയസായ ഒരു ഗായികയെ കണ്ടുമുട്ടി; പുഷ്പവതിയെ അഭിനന്ദിച്ച് ചിന്മയി ശ്രീപദ 
Forget Kanhaiya Kumar, Malyalam singer Pushpavathy is the new face of 'Azadi': See why 
കേൾക്കാനും ചിന്തിക്കാനുമുള്ള പാട്ട്; കരുത്തുള്ള പാട്ടുമായി ഗായിക പുഷ്പാവതി...
 
 പാട്ടിന് പൂട്ടില്ല, ഐസൊലേഷനിലും ലോക്ക് ഡൗണിലും കഴിയുന്നവര്‍ക്കായി പുഷ്പവതി പാടുന്നു 
പാടാന്‍ അവസരം തന്നില്ലെങ്കിലും ഞാനതിനെ മറികടക്കും; എനിക്കതിനുള്ള കാലിബറുണ്ട്: പുഷ്പാവതി സംസാരിക്കുന്നു 
നിശ്ശബ്ദയാകാന്‍ വിസമ്മതിച്ച് പാട്ടിലേക്ക് പിടിച്ചുകയറിയ പുഷ്പവതി 
 Here's the azaadi song: watch the shift from slogans to professional music 
 പുഷ്പവതിക്കും കുട്ടപ്പൻ സാറിനും ശബ്ദമില്ലാത്ത നവകേരളമാണ് സർക്കാർ ...
 കേൾക്കാനും ചിന്തിക്കാനുമുള്ള പാട്ട്; കരുത്തുള്ള പാട്ടുമായി ഗായിക പുഷ്പാവതി...
  ഹം ദേഖേം​ഗേ...' പ്രതിരോധത്തിന്റെ കവിതയ്ക്ക് ഗാനാവിഷ്കാരവുമായി ഗായിക പുഷ്പവതി...

References

1974 births
Living people
Indian women playback singers
Malayalam playback singers
Singers from Kerala
21st-century Indian singers
Women Carnatic singers
Carnatic singers
Indian women folk singers
Indian folk singers
Women musicians from Kerala